John Logan Chipman (June 5, 1830 – August 17, 1893) was a politician from the U.S. state of Michigan who was most notable for his service as a United States representative from 1887 until his death.

Early life
Chipman was born in Detroit in the Michigan Territory, and attended the public schools of Detroit and the University of Michigan at Ann Arbor, 1843-1845. He engaged in the Lake Superior region as explorer for the Montreal Mining Co. in 1846 and was assistant clerk of the Michigan House of Representatives in 1853. He studied law and admitted to the bar in 1854, practicing in the Lake Superior region.

Political career
Chipman returned to Detroit and was city attorney from 1857 to 1860. In 1865 and 1866, he was a member of the Michigan House of Representatives representing the First District of Wayne County.  In 1866, he ran as the Democratic candidate for the United States House of Representatives from Michigan's 1st congressional district, losing in the general election to Republican incumbent Fernando C. Beaman.

Attorney of the police board of Detroit from 1867 to 1879, Chipman was elected judge of the superior court of Detroit on May 1, 1879. He was reelected in 1885 and served until he resigned in 1887.

Elected as a Democrat in 1886 to the Fiftieth Congress and  re-elected to the three succeeding Congresses, Chipman served as United States Representative for the first district of the state of Michigan from March 4, 1887, until his death.

Death
Chipman died of pneumonia in Detroit, Wayne County, Michigan, on August 17, 1893 (age 63 years, 73 days). He is interred at Elmwood Cemetery, Detroit, Michigan.

Family life
The grandson of Nathaniel Chipman, a U.S. Senator from Vermont, Chipman was the son of Henry and Martha Logan Chipman. He married Elizabeth Sha-wa-na, a woman of American Indian descent, and they had two children, Henry and Charlotte.

See also
List of United States Congress members who died in office (1790–1899)

References

External links
 

The Political Graveyard

1830 births
1893 deaths
Democratic Party members of the Michigan House of Representatives
Michigan state court judges
Politicians from Detroit
University of Michigan alumni
Democratic Party members of the United States House of Representatives from Michigan
19th-century American politicians
19th-century American judges
Deaths from pneumonia in Michigan